Santa Cruz is a town in  Saint Elizabeth, Jamaica, on the A2 road connecting Black River to Mandeville. A minor market village until the 1950s, the development of nearby areas for bauxite mining stimulated its growth in the 1950s and 1960s, as did the establishment of the St. Elizabeth Technical High School in 1961.
Santa Cruz has its own courthouse, police station and a wide variety of restaurants alongside supermarkets and funeral parlors. In the 1950s a Korean born medical doctor, Hae Sok Kim, made Santa Cruz his home until his death in 1983.

Populated places in Saint Elizabeth Parish